A snipe hunt is a type of practical joke or fool's errand, in existence in North America as early as the 1840s, in which an unsuspecting newcomer is duped into trying to catch an elusive (fictitious for the purposes of the prank), nonexistent animal called a snipe. Although snipe are an actual family of birds, a snipe hunt is a quest for an imaginary creature whose description varies.

The target of the prank is led to an outdoor spot and given instructions for catching the snipe; these often include waiting in the dark and holding an empty bag or making noises to attract the creature. The others involved in the prank then leave the newcomer alone in the woods to discover the joke. As an American rite of passage, snipe hunting is often associated with summer camps and groups such as the Boy Scouts. In France, a similar joke is called "hunting the dahut".

In North America
Although snipe are a real family of birds, the snipe hunt is a practical joke, often associated with summer camps and other types of outdoor camping, in which the victim is tricked into engaging in a hunt for an imaginary creature.

Snipe hunters are typically led to an outdoor spot at night and given a bag or pillowcase along with instructions that can include either waiting quietly or making odd noises to attract the creatures. The other group members leave, promising to chase the snipe toward the newcomer; instead, they return home or to camp, leaving the victims of the prank alone in the dark to discover that they have been duped and left "holding the bag".

The snipe hunt is a kind of fool's errand or wild-goose chase, meaning a fruitless errand or expedition, attested as early as the 1840s in the United States. It was the most common hazing ritual for boys in American summer camps during the early 20th century, and is a rite of passage often associated with groups such as the Boy Scouts. In camp life and children's folklore, the snipe hunt provides an opportunity to make fun of newcomers while also accepting them into the group.

Setting the stage for the prank is often done with imaginative descriptions of the snipe, similar to tall tales. For instance, the snipe is said to resemble a cross between a jackrabbit and a squirrel; a squirrel-like bird with one red and one green eye; a small, black, furry bird-like animal that only comes out during a full moon, and so on. According to American Folklore: An Encyclopedia:

In another variation, a bag supposedly containing a captured snipe is theatrically brought to the campsite after a group hunt; the snipe quickly "escapes" unseen when the bag is opened.

Variations

A similar practical joke in France is known as "hunting the dahut". While the description of the prey differs from the North American snipe hunt, the nature of the joke is the same.

In Spain, a similar joke is called  ('hunting gamusinos'). The  is an imaginary animal creature with no defined description.

In popular culture

A snipe hunt features prominently in the plot and title of an episode of Cheers. The men of the bar send Frasier Crane on a snipe hunt in the Season 3 episode "The Heart is a Lonely Snipe Hunter."

See also
 Drop bear
 Elwetritsch
 Fearsome critters
 Jackalope
 List of practical joke topics
 Oozlum bird
 Squonk
 Wild haggis

Notes

References

Further reading

External links

 "Snipe Hunting" – University of Southern California Digital Folklore Archives 
 "Snipe Hunt" – James T. Callow Folklore Archive

Practical jokes
In-jokes
American legendary creatures
Fearsome critters
Scouting
Tall tales

fr:Canulars dans la technique